Taradale railway station was located was on the Bendigo line,  from Southern Cross station, and served the township of Taradale.

The line through the station was originally double track, but the section north of Kyneton station was reduced to a single track as a result of the Regional Fast Rail project. However, there is a  crossing loop which incorporates the section of track through the former station, together with the nearby  Taradale Viaduct and the closed Elphinstone station, further towards Bendigo.

Taradale was de-staffed by 1974, before closing to all business on 18 November 1976. The bluestone station building survives and is now a private residence, under lease from VicTrack.

References

External links
 Melway map at street-directory.com.au

Disused railway stations in Victoria (Australia)